Eric Ramírez may refer to:

Eric Ramírez (footballer, born 1996), Argentine forward for Club de Gimnasia y Esgrima La Plata
Eric Ramírez (footballer, born 1998), Venezuelan forward for Slovan Bratislava